Ubaporanga Airport  is the airport serving Caratinga, Brazil, located in the adjoining municipality of Ubaporanga.

History
The operations of the airport are restricted to daytime and with small aircraft.

Airlines and destinations
No scheduled flights operate at this airport.

Accidents and incidents
5 November 2021: a Beechcraft King Air registration PT-ONJ operating a chartered flight from Goiânia to Ubaporanga while on final approach crashed on a waterfall  from the airport, in the municipality of Piedade de Caratinga.  The crash killed all the occupants, being two crew members and three passengers, among them singer Marília Mendonça due to a concert in Caratinga on the same day. Before hitting the ground, the aircraft hit high-voltage tower cables, which, according to pilot reports, had hindered landings in previous months.

Access
It is located near BR-116, in the village of Córrego das Palmeiras.

See also
List of airports in Brazil

References

External links

Airports in Minas Gerais